Aura Cristina Geithner (born March 9, 1967 in Bogota, Colombia) is a Colombian actress. In her teens, she lived in Mexico and studied painting and international public relations. Her twin brother, Harry Geithner, is also an actor.

Trajectory
 La hija pródiga (2017 - TV Azteca) .... Isabel Barragán de Montejo
 Despertar contigo (2016 - Televisa) .... Antonia Santamaría"c-protagonist"
 Tanto amor  (2015 - Azteca) .... Altagracia Hernández de Roldán"Antagonist"
 Siempre Tuya Acapulco (2014 - Azteca) .... Angustias Molina Vda. de Hernández "Antagonist"
 Los Rey (2012 - Azteca) - Lucero
 Quererte Así (2012 - Azteca) .... Emilia Duncan - antagonist.
 Cielo Rojo (2011 - Azteca)....  Mariana de Molina-antagonist.
 Secretos del alma (2009 - TV Azteca) .... Laura Kuri - antagonist
 Mujeres asesinas (2008 - RCN Televisión) .... Laura, la encubridora "protagonist"
 Las profesionales, a su servicio (2007) .... Beatriz González - protagonist
 Decisiones (2005-2006 - RTI/Telemundo) - protagonist
 La tormenta (2005 - RTI/Telemundo) .... Bernarda Ayala - guest starring
 Luna, la heredera (2004) .... Daniela Lombardo - antagonist
 Gata Salvaje (2003) .... Maribella Tovar - antagonist
 Secreto de amor (2001) .... Barbara Serrano Zulbarán - Main antagonist
 Hombres (1997) .... María del Pilar Velázquez (Lilica) - protagonist
 Eternamente Manuela (1995) .... Manuela Quijano - protagonist
 La potra Zaina (1993) .... Soledad Ahumada - protagonist
 Sangre de lobos (1992).... Silvia Martínez - protagonist
 La casa de las dos palmas (1991) .... Zoraida Vélez - protagonist
 Te voy a enseñar a querer (1990) .... Diana Rivera - protagonist
 La rosa de los vientos (1989) .... María Conchita - debut

Discography 
 Soundtrack of telenovela “La casa de las dos palmas”  (1991) with Sonolux, Colombia
 Soundtrack of  telenovela “La potra zaina” (1993) with Sonolux, Colombia
 Disco “Calor” (1994) with Sonolux, Colombia
 La negra Celina
 Para qué
 Arco iris
 Un besito
 Ahora
 Mi flauta
 Yerbabuena
 Leona
 Luz del sol
 Juana la marrana y el ladrón de pueblo
 Arco iris ( Piano)
 Disco “Firme hasta el fin” (sin publicar) (1993) con Sonolux, Colombia

Conciertos 
 
 Teatro Metropolitano de Medellín (Medellín Cultura) (1995)
 Club hípico Bacata (1995)
 Bolsa de valores  (Cartagena -Plaza de la Aduana) (1995)
 Batallón de sanidad (Ministerio de Justicia) (1995)
 Presentación Medellín”Bar discoteca Fantasías” (1995)
 Presentación Barrio Kennedy (Sonolux) (1995)
 Concierto en la Ciudad de Bello ( Evento “La defensa de la Vida del joven”. Gobernación y La Organización Ardilla Lulle”)
 Concierto plaza Bolívar (Cervecería Leona S.A.)(1995)
 Concierto ciudad de Cali “Inextra S.A.” (1995)
 Concierto plaza Bolívar (Postobon) (1995)
 Presentación de rancheras Global Humanitaria (teatro Leonardos) (2008)

References

External links

Colombian people of German descent
Colombian telenovela actresses
Living people
1967 births
Colombian twins
Actresses from Bogotá